The Apple War is a 1971 Swedish comedy-drama film directed by Tage Danielsson, starring Gösta Ekman, Hans Alfredsson, Tage Danielsson, Monica Zetterlund and Max von Sydow. The political theme of the film is the battle between nature on the one hand and commercialisation and industrialisation on the other set to exploit and ultimately destroy land and natural resources. The film can also be seen as an early criticism of globalisation as it depicts foreign, and large scale, capitalist investors and entrepreneurs as exploiters working side by side with domestic, small scale, capitalists.

The songs in The Apple War are composed and written by Evert Taube, who also makes a cameo in the film as the old man who dances with Monica Zetterlund at the end party, and while there also recites a part of one of his most famous songs, "Calle Schewens vals", performed by the cast in the same scene at the end. Winner of three Guldbagge Awards, The Apple War is a popular cult film in Sweden, and referred to as a "Hasse & Tage" film due to the creators Tage Danielsson and Hasse Alfredson.

Plot
A Swiss businessman wants to buy land in southern Sweden for a gigantic amusement park, his new project called "Deutschneyland" (a wordplay of Deutschland and Disneyland). Some of the locals dislike the idea, including the magically talented Lindberg family, and work to frustrate the development plans.

Cast
 Per Grundén as Jean Volkswagner
 Gösta Ekman as Sten Wall
 Per Waldvik as Hans Nilsson
 Yvonne Lombard as Kerstin Gustafson
 Sten Kärrby as Tore Gustafson
 Monica Zetterlund as Anna Lindberg
 Håkan Serner as Eberhard Lindberg
 Hans Alfredson as Severin Lindberg
 Birgitta Andersson as Luft-Hanna Lindberg
 Anne-Marie Nyman as Agnes Lindberg
 Nils Ahlroth as Gustav Lindberg / jätte
 Nils Nittel as Bert Lindberg
 Mariette Fransson as Janet Lindberg / skogsrå
 Martin Ljung as Åke Lindberg
 Max von Sydow as Roy Lindberg
 Tage Danielsson as Bernhard Lindberg
 Sture Ericson as Larsson i Tofta
 Ingvar Ottoson as Werner Affeman
 Gus Dahlström as Film director
 Tomas Alfredson as Count
 Karl Erik Flens as Valfrid Paulsson

Songs by Evert Taube used in the soundtrack
In order:

"Änglamark" (instrumental; at the beginning of the film)
"Mirrabooka marsch" (instrumental)
"Solig morgon" (instrumental)
"Sjösala vals" (hummed by a woman off camera)
"Calle Lång dansar portugis" (instrumental)
"Diktaren och Tiden" (instrumental)
"Julius och Mariella" (instrumental)
"Byssan lull" (instrumental)
"Möte i monsunen" (instrumental)
"Stockholmsmelodi", performed by Evert Taube (recited)
"Pierina eller Blå anemonerna", performed by Thord Carlsson, Folke Eng, Lars Malgefors, Håkan Norlen and Lillemor Lysell
"Fritiof Anderssons paradmarsch" (instrumental)
"Bal på Skeppsholmen" (instrumental- "domino effect" sequence)
"Min älskling (du är som en ros)" (instrumental)
"Nocturne" (instrumental - Herr Volkswagner goes to sleep)
"Calle Schewens vals", performed by Martin Ljung, Max von Sydow, Birgitta Andersson, Monica Zetterlund, Hans Alfredson and Evert Taube (at the outdoor wedding/summer party/picnic)
"Änglamark", performed by Sven-Bertil Taube (at the end credits)

Awards
The film won the Swedish Film Institute's Guldbagge Award ("Golden Beetle") award in 1972 in three categories:

Best Film
Best Director - Tage Danielsson
Best Actress - Monica Zetterlund

References

External links

1971 films
1971 comedy-drama films
1970s Swedish-language films
Films directed by Tage Danielsson
Best Film Guldbagge Award winners
Films whose director won the Best Director Guldbagge Award
1971 comedy films
1971 drama films
Swedish comedy-drama films
1970s Swedish films